The 1903–04 Northern Rugby Football Union season was the ninth season of rugby league football.

Season summary

The League Champions were Bradford and the Challenge Cup Winners were Halifax.

Keighley and Huddersfield were demoted from the top division and replaced by Wakefield Trinity (champions) and St. Helens.

As the top two teams had finished level on points and Points Difference had not been introduced as a tie breaker yet, despite having a worse points difference, Bradford contested a play-off with Salford, that Bradford won 5-0.

In the Second Division, Manningham and Stockport were replaced by Pontefract, reducing the competition to 17 teams. Birkenhead Wanderers dropped the Wanderers from their name.

The second promotion place had to be decided by a play-off as Points Difference had not yet been introduced as a tie breaker.  St. Helens beat Holbeck 7-0.

There was no county league competition this season.

Internationals

On 5 April 1904, the first ever International Rugby League match took place between England and Other Nationalities. It was played at Central Park, Wigan, having originally been scheduled for New Year's Day in Oldham. England lost 3-9 in a twelve sided match, with the opposition made up of ten Welshmen and two Scots. The crowd numbered just 6,000.

Teams

Division One

Championship play-off: Bradford vs Salford 5-0

Division two

Promotion play-off: St. Helens vs Holbeck 7-0

Challenge Cup

Halifax beat Warrington 8-3 in the final at Salford's The Willows before a paying crowd of 17,041, plus 1,000 additional guests, to become the second team to record back-to-back Cup wins. Halifax wouldn’t reach another final until 1921 nor win the Cup again until 1931.

Sources
1903-04 Rugby Football League season at wigan.rlfans.com
The Challenge Cup at The Rugby Football League website

References

1903 in English rugby league
1904 in English rugby league
Northern Rugby Football Union seasons